Sobolyata is a rural locality (a village) in Vereshchaginsky District, Perm Krai, Russia.  The population was 146 as of 2010. There are  2 streets.

Geography 
Sobolyata is located 14 km northeast of Vereshchagino (the district's administrative centre) by road. Buzynyata is the nearest rural locality.

References 

Rural localities in Vereshchaginsky District